Křečhoř is a municipality and village in Kolín District in the Central Bohemian Region of the Czech Republic. It has about 500 inhabitants.

Administrative parts
Villages of Kamhajek and Kutlíře are administrative parts of Křečhoř.

Notable people
Gustav Frištenský (1879–1957), strongman and wrestler

References

Villages in Kolín District